Yusuke Suzuki may refer to:

, Japanese racewalker
, Japanese footballer
 Yusuke Suzuki (basketball) (born 1997), Japanese basketball player